The following is an (incomplete) list of radio stations in Portugal.

National radio stations 
Associação Rádio Maria Portugal
Radio Maria (Christian music, Catholic Church devotions and prayers)

Rádio e Televisão de Portugal
Antena 1 (Information, light music)
Antena 2 (Jazz, classical music, culture)
Antena 3 (Alternative music, promotion of portuguese bands)

Grupo Renascença
Rádio Renascença (Information, pop music, oldies)
RFM (Pop, music, Café Da Mannhã)
Mega Hits (Pop Music, rock)
Rádio Sim (Oldies music (1970s, 1980s and 1990s), Church services)

Grupo Media Capital
Rádio Comercial (Pop, music, rock)
Cidade (R&B, dance)
Best Rock FM (Punk rock, hard rock, alternative Rock, Pop rock, Metal)
M80 Radio (Oldies music (1970s, 1980s and 1990s))
Mix FM (Dance, Techno, Electro, House)
Vodafone FM (Indie, Alternative rock, Portuguese music)
Smooth FM (Jazz, blues, soul, bossa nova)

Global Media Group
TSF (Information, Contemporary Music)

Lusocanal|Grupo Lusocanal / Música no Coração
Rádio Capital (Information, Rock)
Rádio Radar (Alternative Music, Culturs, Information)
Oxigénio (Alternative Music, indie Rock)

For more detailed listings, please see FMLIST or FMSCAN

Portuguese radio stations

Portuguese radio stations

Most-heard radio stations

Monthly radio audience shares in December 2022:

Defunct radio stations 

Rádio Cidade

See also
 Media of Portugal
 List of newspapers in Portugal
 Television in Portugal
 Telecommunications in Portugal

References

 
Portugal